XHEML-FM is a radio station on 98.3 FM in Apatzingán, Michoacán, Mexico. It is known as La Ranchera de Apatzingán.

History
XEML-AM received its concession on November 29, 1961. It was owned by Esperanza Murguia de Navarro and broadcast with 250 watts as a daytimer on 770 kHz. XEML was sold to a corporation in 1971. It raised its daytime power to 1 kW in the 1980s and then to 5 kW day and 1 kW night in the 1990s.

XEML received approval to migrate to FM in 2011.

References

Radio stations in Michoacán
Radio stations in Mexico with continuity obligations